Fredonia is a town in Coconino County, Arizona, United States. As of the 2010 census it had a population of 1,314. Fredonia is the gateway to the North Rim of the Grand Canyon.

History
Fredonia was laid out in 1886. Its name is said to mean the "land of free women."

The town's cemetery has graves dating from the 1880s.

The town suffered economically from the re-routing of U.S. 89 in 1960. While the highway previously went through Fredonia, it was re-routed north of the Glen Canyon dam, and the town lost several businesses due to a drop in traffic.

Senator Barry Goldwater gave the commencement at Fredonia High School in 1964.

Kaibab Forest Products was the major industry in town until 1995, when it closed and laid off 200 workers. It had employed up to 400 workers in 1988. The Arizona One mine is also located nearby.

Demographics

As of the census of 2000, there were 1,036 people, 359 households, and 287 families residing in the town. The racial makeup of the town was 85.7% White, 1.1% Black or African American, 11.4% Native American, 0.4% from other races, and 1.5% from two or more races. 1.5% of the population were Hispanic or Latino of any race.

There were 359 households, out of which 37.9% had children under the age of 18 living with them, 65.5% were married couples living together, 10.0% had a female householder with no husband present, and 19.8% were non-families. 15.9% of all households were made up of individuals, and 5.3% had someone living alone who was 65 years of age or older. The average household size was 2.89 and the average family size was 3.25.

In the town, the age distribution of the population shows 32.3% under the age of 18, 6.2% from 18 to 24, 27.7% from 25 to 44, 22.7% from 45 to 64, and 11.1% who were 65 years of age or older. The median age was 35 years. For every 100 females, there were 104.3 males. For every 100 females age 18 and over, there were 98.0 males.

The median income for a household in the town was $30,288, and the median income for a family was $30,913. Males had a median income of $24,904 versus $19,554 for females. The per capita income for the town was $13,309. About 12.3% of families and 15.0% of the population were below the poverty line, including 25.4% of those under age 18 and 3.2% of those age 65 or over.

Geography and climate
It is in the Arizona Strip, the portion of Arizona lying north of the Colorado River, and is within a few miles of the Utah border.

Fredonia is also located within a short distance of other national parks, national monuments, state parks, and scenic outdoor recreation spots.

Education
Fredonia is a part of the Fredonia-Moccasin Unified School District. Two schools, Fredonia Elementary School and Fredonia High/Middle School, serve the town.

See also

 List of localities in Arizona
 Pipe Spring National Monument

References

 George R. Stewart. Names on the Land. Houghton Mifflin Company: Boston (1967)

External links
 Town of Fredonia official website
 
 

Populated places established in 1886
1886 establishments in Arizona Territory
Towns in Coconino County, Arizona
Cemeteries in Arizona